Senator Neville may refer to:

Steven Neville (born 1950), New Mexico State Senate
Tim Neville, Colorado State Senate

See also
Thomas M. Neuville (born 1950), Minnesota State Senate